Aeshna subarctica, the subarctic darner, is a species of darner in the family Aeshnidae. It is found in Europe and Northern Asia (excluding China) and North America.

The IUCN conservation status of Aeshna subarctica is "LC", least concern, with no immediate threat to the species' survival. The population is stable.

Subspecies
These two subspecies belong to the species Aeshna subarctica:
 Aeshna subarctica elisabethae Djakonov, 1922 c g
 Aeshna subarctica subarctica Walker, 1908 i g
Data sources: i = ITIS, c = Catalogue of Life, g = GBIF, b = Bugguide.net

References

Further reading

External links

 

Aeshnidae
Articles created by Qbugbot
Insects described in 1908